The 1950 LPGA Tour was the first official season of the LPGA Tour. The season ran from January 19 to October 21. It consisted of 15 official money events. Babe Zaharias won the most tournaments, eight. She also led the money list with earnings of $14,800.

The tournament results are listed below.

Tournament results
The following table shows all the official money events for the 1950 season. "Date" is the ending date of the tournament. The numbers in parentheses after the winners' names are the number of wins they had on the tour up to and including that event. Majors are shown in bold. Note that the LPGA recognizes several pre-1950 tournaments as official wins.

(a) - amateur
* - non-member at time of win

References

External links
LPGA Tour official site

LPGA Tour seasons
LPGA Tour